Jonathan Malu (born March 19, 1993) is a Congolese-German professional basketball player who formerly played for Alba Berlin of the Basketball Bundesliga. Malu usually plays as power forward or center.

Professional career
In August 2016, Malu signed a 1-year contract with Alba Berlin. Malu made his debut for Berlin in a 73–77 win over Science City Jena, in which he played 2 minutes.

DR Congo national team
Malu played 3 games for the DR Congo national basketball team at the 2019 FIBA Basketball World Cup qualification where he averaged 6 minutes and 2.0 rebounds per game.

References

1993 births
Living people
Democratic Republic of the Congo men's basketball players
German men's basketball players
Alba Berlin players
Giessen 46ers players
Eisbären Bremerhaven players
Power forwards (basketball)
Ehingen Urspring players
21st-century Democratic Republic of the Congo people